Saint-Loup-en-Champagne (before 2002: Saint-Loup-Champagne) is a commune in the Ardennes department in northern France.

Population

Church
The church tower was rebuilt above the portal, while the old Romanesque tower was in its normal place at the crossing of the transept. It forms a porch on the ground floor, before the nave rebuilt with it.

This church built during the eleventh century, enlarged and embellished four hundred years later, threatening to collapse. It has also been restored twice, through the combined efforts of the municipality and state. The transept and sanctuary were restored in 1879 to 1880. The nave and tower were rebuilt in 1887.  The architecture of the tower, like the nave, is inspired by the flamboyant Gothic lines of the apse. The attic is covered with slate.

See also
Communes of the Ardennes department

References

Communes of Ardennes (department)
Ardennes communes articles needing translation from French Wikipedia